Kung Fu Angels is a 2014 Hong Kong-Chinese romantic comedy film directed by Herman Yau. It was released on December 4 in Hong Kong and on December 11 in China.

Cast
Karena Ng
Jeremy Tsui
Janelle Sing
Alex Lam
Zhang Chuchu
Tats Lau
Johnson Yuen Tak Cheong
Song Jia
Raymond Wong

Box office
By December 12, 2014, the film had earned ¥0.32 million at the Chinese box office.

References

2014 romantic comedy films
Chinese romantic comedy films
Films directed by Herman Yau
Hong Kong romantic comedy films
2010s Hong Kong films